Rudi Erebara (born 1971) is an Albanian writer and translator. He studied at the Academy of Fine Arts in Tirana before becoming a journalist. He has published works of poetry as well as a couple of novels, namely Vezët e thëllëzave (Eggs of the Quails, 2010) and Epika e yjeve të mëngjesit (The Epic of the Morning Stars, 2016). He was awarded the EU Prize for Literature in 2017.

References

Albanian writers
1971 births
Living people
Place of birth missing (living people)
Date of birth missing (living people)